Cadorela is a monotypic moth genus in the subfamily Lymantriinae. Its only species, Cadorela translucida, is found in south-western Madagascar. Both the genus and the species were first described by Paul Griveaud in 1973.

The male of this species has a wingspan of 18 mm, head and front are clear brown, palpi beige, fine and turned downwards. Antennae are dark brown and largely pectinated (comb like). Thorax is brown black, abdomen brown black on the upperside, and brown yellowish on the underside.

The holotype of this species was found east of Sakaraha in the Zombitse-Vohibasia National Park at 640 m.

References

Lymantriinae
Moths described in 1973
Moths of Madagascar
Moths of Africa
Monotypic moth genera